Joan Butcher may refer to:
Joan Bocher (died 1550), also known as Joan Butcher, English Anabaptist
Joan Garwood, also known as Joan Butcher, fictional character on BBC TV soap opera EastEnders